Cosign may mean:

Co-signing, promising to pay another person's debt arising out of contract if that person fails to do so
CoSign single sign on, a secure single sign-on web authentication system

See also
Cosine (disambiguation)